The 2017–18 Sam Houston State Bearkats women's basketball team represented Sam Houston State University during the 2017–18 NCAA Division I women's basketball season. The Bearkats, led by twelfth year head coach Brenda Welch-Nichols, played their home games at the Bernard Johnson Coliseum and were members of the Southland Conference. They finished the season 4–23, 1–17 in Southland play to finish in thirteenth place. They failed to qualify for the Southland women's tournament.

On March 7, Welch-Nicholls has agreed "parted ways". She finished at Sam Houston State with a 12 year record of 119–234. On April 12, former Prairie View A&M head coach Ravon Justice was announced as her replacement.

Roster
Sources:

Schedule
Sources:

|-
!colspan=9 style="background:#FF7F00; color:#FFFFFF;"| Non–conference games

|-
!colspan=9 style="background:#FF7F00; color:#FFFFFF;"| Southland Conference regular season

See also
2017–18 Sam Houston State Bearkats men's basketball team

References

Sam Houston Bearkats women's basketball seasons
Sam Houston State
Sam Houston State Bearkats basketball
Sam Houston State Bearkats basketball